Athletes from the Socialist Federal Republic of Yugoslavia competed at the 1980 Summer Olympics in Moscow, USSR. 164 competitors, 135 men and 28 women, took part in 69 events in 17 sports.

Medalists

Archery

In the second time the nation competed in Olympic archery, Yugoslavia again entered only one man. He came in eleventh place, missing a top eight finish by eight points.

Men's Individual Competition:
Zoran Matković – 2410 points (11th place)

Athletics

Men's 200 metres
Aleksandar Popović
 Heat – 21.65 
 Quarterfinals – 21.66 (→ did not advance)

Men's 400 metres
Josip Alebić
 Heat – 47.61 
 Quarterfinals – 46.60 (→ did not advance)

Men's 800 metres
Milovan Savić
 Heat – 1:49.2 
 Semifinals – 1:47.6 (→ did not advance)

Men's 1,500 metres
Dragan Zdravković
 Heat – 3:44.0 
 Semifinals – 3:43.4
 Final – 3:43.1 (→ 9th place)

Men's 4x400 metres Relay
 Zeijko Knapić, Milovan Savić, Rok Kopitar, and Josip Alebić
 Heat – 3:05.3 (→ did not advance)

Men's 110 m Hurdles
 Borisav Pisić
 Heat – 14.13
 Semifinals – 14.16 (→ did not advance)
 Petar Vukičević
 Heat – 14.19
 Semifinals – 14.12 (→ did not advance)

Men's 400 m Hurdles
 Rok Kopitar
 Heat – 50.34
 Semifinals – 50.55
 Final – 49.67 (→ 5th place)

Men's High Jump
 Vaso Komnenić
 Qualification – 2.21 m
 Final – 2.24 m (→ 6th place)

Men's Long Jump
 Nenad Stekić
 Qualification – 5.75 m (→ did not advance)

Men's Triple Jump
Milan Spasojević
 Qualification – 16.48 m
 Final – 16.09 m (→ 10th place)

Men's Shot Put
Vladimir Milic
 Qualification – 20.56 m
 Final – 20.07 m (→ 8th place)

Women's 1,500 metres
 Breda Pergar
 Heat – 4:13.2 (→ did not advance)

Women's High Jump
 Lidija Benedetič
 Qualification – 1.80 m (→ did not advance)

Basketball

Boxing

Men's Bantamweight (– 54 kg)
Fazlija Sacirović
 First Round – Bye
 Second Round – Lost to Veli Koota (Finland) after referee stopped contest in second round

Men's Featherweight (– 57 kg)
Dejan Marović
 First Round – Bye
 Second Round – Defeated Miroslav Šandor (Czechoslovakia) on points (5-0)
 Third Round – Lost to Krzysztof Kosedowski (Poland) on points (1-4)

Men's Lightweight (– 60 kg)
Geza Tumbas
 First Round – Defeated Norman Stevens (Australia) on points (4-1)
 Second Round – Lost to Angel Herrera (Cuba) on points (0-5)

Men's Light-Welterweight (– 63,5 kg)
Ace Rusevski
 First Round – Defeated Margarit Anastasov (Bulgaria) on points (4-1)
 Second Round – Defeated Boualem Bel Alouane (Algeria) on points (5-0)
 Quarter Finals – Lost to Patrizio Oliva (Italy) on points (2-3)

Men's Heavyweight (+ 81 kg)
Aziz Salihu
 First Round – Lost to Piotr Zaev (Soviet Union) on points (0-5)

Canoeing

Cycling

Four cyclists represented Yugoslavia in 1980.

Individual road race
 Bruno Bulić
 Vinko Polončič
 Bojan Ropret
 Bojan Udovič

Team time trial
 Bruno Bulić
 Vinko Polončič
 Bojan Ropret
 Bojan Udovič

Football

Men's team competition
 PRELIMINARY ROUND (GROUP D)

 July 21, 1980
 Yugoslavia - Finland 2-0 (0-0) Dinamo Stadium, Minsk

 July 23, 1980
 Yugoslavia - Costa Rica 3-2 (2-1) Dinamo Stadium, Minsk

 July 25, 1980
 Yugoslavia - Iraq 1-1 (0-0) Dinamo Stadium, Minsk

 FINAL STANDINGS GROUP D:

 1. Yugoslavia          3 2 1 0 ( 6- 3) 5 *
 2. Iraq                3 1 2 0 ( 4- 1) 4 *
 3. Finland             3 1 1 1 ( 3- 2) 3
 4. Costa Rica          3 0 0 3 ( 2- 9) 0

 * Qualified for quarter-finals

 QUARTER-FINALS

 July 27, 1980
 Yugoslavia - Algeria 3-0 (2-0) Dinamo Stadium, Minsk

 SEMI-FINALS

 July 29, 1980
 Czechoslovakia - Yugoslavia 2-0 (2-0) Dynamo Stadium, Moscow

 BRONZE MEDAL GAME

 August 1, 1980 
 Yugoslavia - Soviet Union 0-2 (0-0) Dynamo Stadium, Moscow

Team Roster
Dragan Pantelić
Nikica Cukrov
Ivan Gudelj
Miloš Hrstić
Milan Jovin
Nikica Klinčarski
Mišo Krstičević
Dževad Šećerbegović
Vladimir Matijević
Ante Miročević
Dušan Pešić
Tomislav Ivković
Boro Primorac
Srebrenko Repčić
Miloš Šestić
Zlatko Vujović
Zoran Vujović

Handball

Men's team competition
Preliminary Round (Group B)
 Defeated Algeria (22-18)
 Defeated Switzerland (26-21)
 Defeated Romania (23-21)
 Defeated Kuwait (44-10)
 Lost to Soviet Union (17-22)
Classification Match
 5th/6th place: Lost to Spain (23-24) → 6th place
Team Roster
 Zlatan Arnautović
 Momir Rnic
 Enver Koso
 Drago Jovović
 Stjepan Obran
 Jasmin Mrkonja
 Petar Mahne
 Pavel Jurina
 Goran Nerić
 Jovica Cvetković
 Velibor Nenadić
 Adnan Dizdar
 Mile Isaković
 Jovica Elezović

Judo
Men's Heavyweight

 Radomir Kovacevic
 Bronze medal

Rowing

Sailing
Men's Flying Dutchman 

 Danko Mandić 
 Final standing - 9th place
 Zoran Kalebić
 Final standing - 9th place

Men's Finn class

 Minski Fabras
 Final standing - 11th place

Shooting

Swimming

Men's 200m Freestyle
Borut Petrič
 Final – 1.56,51 (→ did not advance)

Men's 1.500m Freestyle
Borut Petrič
 Final – 15.21,78 (→ 5th place)

Volleyball

Men's team competition
Preliminary Round (Group B)
 Lost to Poland (1-3)
 Defeated Brazil (3-2)
 Lost to Romania (1-3)
 Defeated Libya (3-0)
Classification Matches
 5th/8th place: Defeated Cuba (3-2)
 5th/6th place: Lost to Brazil (2-3) → 6th place
Team Roster
 Vladimir Bogoevski
 Vladimir Trifunović
 Aleksandar Tacevski
 Zdravko Kuljić
 Goran Srbinovski
 Slobodan Lozančić
 Ivica Jelić
 Boro Jović
 Radovan Malević
 Miodrag Mitić
 Ljubomir Travica
 Mladen Kašić

Water polo

Men's team competition
Preliminary Round (Group C)
 Drew with Cuba (6-6)
 Defeated Bulgaria (9-2)
 Defeated Australia (9-2)
Final Round (Group A)
 Drew with Cuba (7-7)
 Defeated Hungary (8-7)
 Defeated Netherlands (5-4)
 Defeated Spain (7-6)
 Lost to Soviet Union (7-8) → Silver Medal
Team Roster
 Luka Vezilić
 Zoran Gopcević
 Damir Polić
 Ratko Rudić
 Zoran Mustur
 Zoran Roje
 Milivoj Bebić
 Slobodan Trifunović
 Boško Lozica
 Predrag Manojlović
 Milorad Krivokapić

Weightlifting

Wrestling

References

External links
Official Olympic Reports
International Olympic Committee results database

Nations at the 1980 Summer Olympics
1980
Summer Olympics